Felicia Eze  (27 September 1974 – 31 January 2012) was a Nigerian footballer. She competed for Nigeria at the 2004 Summer Olympics. Eze died on 31 January 2012 in Anambra State after a brief illness, aged 37.

See also
 Football at the 2004 Summer Olympics

References

External links
 

1974 births
2012 deaths
Olympic footballers of Nigeria
Footballers at the 2004 Summer Olympics
Nigerian women's footballers
Nigeria women's international footballers
Women's association football midfielders
Igbo people
 People from Anambra State